Calleidomorpha nigroaenea is a species of beetle in the family Carabidae, the only species in the genus Calleidomorpha.

References

Lebiinae